Daucus pumilus is a species of plants in the carrot family Apiaceae.

References 

pumilus
Flora of Malta